Abhijit (sometimes spelled Abhijeet) may refer to:

Abhijith (actor), Indian actor, born 1963
Abhijeet Bhattacharya, better known as Abhijeet, a Bollywood playback singer
Abhijit (name)
Abhijit (nakshatra), in Hindu astrology and Indian astronomy, the lunar mansion of Vega
Senior Inspector Abhijeet, a character in Indian TV series CID